Ramón Iglesias i Navarri (28 January 1889 in Vall de Boí – 31 March 1972) was a Spanish Roman Catholic bishop. He was the Bishop of Urgell and  Episcopal Co-Prince of Andorra from 4 April 1943, until 29 April 1969. During World War II, he helped to keep Andorra neutral and strongly promoted a Spanish influence in the principality. It is during his time that tourism was developed. Navarri was ordained priest on 14 July 1912, at the age of 23.

1889 births
1972 deaths
20th-century Princes of Andorra
People from the Province of Lleida
Bishops of Urgell
Participants in the Second Vatican Council
Vall de Boí
World War II political leaders
20th-century Roman Catholic bishops in Spain